A1C may refer to:

Airman First Class, the third enlisted rank in the United States Air Force
Glycated hemoglobin (hemoglobin A1c or  HbA1c), a surrogate marker for blood glucose levels